Iwakura Dam is a dam in Urugi, Nagano Prefecture, Japan, completed in 1936.

References 

Dams in Nagano Prefecture
Dams completed in 1936
Gravity dams